The Models of Margutta (Italian: Le modelle di via Margutta) is a 1946 Italian drama film directed by Giuseppe Maria Scotese and starring Liliana Laine, Claudio Gora and Carlo Campanini. The film is set amongst the artistic community who live on the Via Margutta in Rome. Several real artists appeared in the film as themselves.

Cast

References

Bibliography
 Hischak, Thomas S. The Encyclopedia of Film Composers. Rowman & Littlefield, 2015.

External links

1946 films
1946 drama films
1940s Italian-language films
Italian drama films
Films set in Rome
Films directed by Giuseppe Maria Scotese
Films scored by Giovanni Fusco
Italian black-and-white films
1940s Italian films